Nkantolo is a village in Mbizana Local Municipality in the Eastern Cape province of South Africa. It is known as the birthplace of former African National Congress president and revolutionary, Oliver Tambo.

References

External links

Populated places in the Mbizana Local Municipality